The 2013 FIVB Beach Volleyball Swatch World Championships was a beach volleyball double-gender event, held from 1 to 7 July 2013 in Stare Jabłonki, Poland. The FIVB Beach Volleyball World Championships are organized every two years, and Poland hosted the event for the first time. 48 teams per gender entered the competition making 96 total.

The match schedule was published on 20 June 2013.

Medal summary

Medal events

Medal table

Men's event

Round Robin

Pool A

|}

|}

Pool B

|}

|}

Pool C

|}

|}

Pool D

|}

|}

Pool E

|}

|}

Pool F

|}

|}

Pool G

|}

|}

Pool H

|}

|}

Pool J

|}

|}

Pool K

|}

|}

Pool L

|}

|}

Pool M

|}

|}

Ranking of third-placed teams
The eight best third-placed teams advanced to the round of 32.

|}

Knockout stage

Round of 32

|}

Round of 16

|}

Quarterfinals

|}

Semifinals

|}

Third place game

|}

Final

|}

Women's event

Round Robin

Pool A

|}

|}

Pool B

|}

|}

Pool C

|}

|}

Pool D

|}

|}

Pool E

|}

|}

Pool F

|}

|}

Pool G

|}

|}

Pool H

|}

|}

Pool J

|}

|}

Pool K

|}

|}

Pool L

|}

|}

Pool M

|}

|}

Ranking of third-placed teams
The eight best third-placed teams advanced to the round of 32.

|}

Knockout stage

Round of 32

|}

Round of 16

|}

Quarterfinals

|}

Semifinals

|}

Third place game

|}

Final

|}

References

External links
FIVB website

2013
World Championships
Beach Volleyball World Championships
Beach Volleyball World Championships
2013 Beach Volleyball World Championships